École Rose-des-Vents may refer to:
École Rose-des-Vents (Vancouver)
École Rose-des-Vents (Nova Scotia)